The Minister of Local Government and Modernisation is a Councillor of State and Chief of the Norwegian Ministry of Local Government and Regional Development. Currently, Centre Sigbjørn Gjelsvik has held the post since 2022. The ministry is responsible for local administration, including municipalities and county municipalities, rural and regional policy, information technology, elections and government administration, including management of state real estate and government employment. Major subordinate agencies include the Government Administration Services, Statsbygg, the Competition Authority, the National Office of Building Technology and Administration, the State Housing Bank and the Data Protection Authority.

The position was created in 1948 as a successor of the Minister of Labour, originally named the Minister of Local Government and Labour. The title changed to the Minister of Local Government. Labour issues were moved to the Minister of Government Administration and Labour in 1997 and the title was changed to the Minister of Local Government and Regional Development. This lasted until 2013, when the position took over part of the portfolio of the Minister of Public Administration and took the current name.

Key
The following lists the minister, their party, date of assuming and leaving office, their tenure in years and days, and the cabinet they served in.

Ministers

Minister of Digitalization
The Minister of Digitalization was responsible for the government's digitalization policies, and to coordinate their UN sustainability goals. The post was also responsible for the work and issues related to electronic communication. In 2020, the title was changed to Minister of Districts and Digitalization, and in addition to digitalization policies, the minister was also responsible for overlooking the regional and district policies, privacy and policies related to the Sami people and other minorities in the country.

Key

Minister

References

Lists of government ministers of Norway
 
Norway
Norway
1948 establishments in Norway